Rob Hardy  (born 1972), is an English cinematographer. He frequently collaborates with director Alex Garland, working on the science fiction films, Ex Machina and Annihilation and the television show Devs. He has also worked with John Crowley on his films Boy A (2007) and Is Anybody There? (2008). His other works include The Invisible Woman, Testament of Youth and Mission: Impossible – Fallout.

Life and career
Born in Barking, London, Hardy attended Newport Film School and Northern Media School in Sheffield Hallam University where he specialised in cinematography. Soon after, he started shooting music videos in the 90s in Sheffield, he also took on jobs for theatre companies experimenting with video art before transitioning as a DP for commercials. His major breakthrough would come when he served as director of photography for John Crowley's Boy A starring Andrew Garfield which won him the BAFTA Award for Best Photography and Lighting - Fiction/Entertainment.

In 2015, Hardy served as director of photography for Ex Machina which marked his first collaboration with Alex Garland. In an interview with Mandy, Hardy stated that he immediately accepted the job after reading the script, and that Garland had liked his work in Red Riding. Speaking of the collaboration, Hardy called the director a "great collaborator who takes a no nonsense approach which gets to the heart of it quickly." Early discussions with Garland mainly talked about propelling the film's small nature into a much larger scale as well as several inspirations such as Kazimir Malevich's abstracted art style and Saul Leiter's photographic portfolio. Hardy later reunited with Garland for Annihilation in 2018. Talking about the aspects of the film, Hardy used plants and sculptures as reference points as well as experimenting with different cameras and lenses to create "trippy effects" which layered over several other methods.

Later that year, he photographed the sixth entry of the Mission: Impossible film series, Mission: Impossible – Fallout, directed by Christopher McQuarrie. According to an interview published by British Cinematographer, Hardy stated that the film was "a completely different kind of challenge" and that McQuarrie wanted the film to be practical, eyeing for a more gritty and realistic feel. This approach opted for Hardy to operate the camera on his own, allowing for him to be closer to the action.

Filmography
Films

Television

References

External links

1972 births
Living people
People from Barking, London
English cinematographers
BAFTA winners (people)